Guzmania zahnii is a plant species in the genus Guzmania. This species is native to Panama, Nicaragua, and Costa Rica.

Cultivars
 Guzmania 'Chevalieri'
 Guzmania 'Elaine'
 Guzmania Eliane (Elaine)
 Guzmania 'Exotica'
 Guzmania 'Fantasia'
 Guzmania 'Feuer'
 Guzmania 'Feurn'
 Guzmania 'Gisela (Giesela)'
 Guzmania 'Glory Of Ghent'
 Guzmania 'Golden King'
 Guzmania 'Hilde'
 Guzmania 'Insignis'
 Guzmania 'Land Alice'
 Guzmania 'Lingulzahnii'
 Guzmania 'Madam Omer Morobe'
 Guzmania 'Marlebeca'
 Guzmania 'Muriel'
 Guzmania 'Omer Morobe'
 Guzmania 'Symphonie'
 Guzmania 'Victrix'
 xGuzvriesea 'Elata'
 xGuzvriesea 'Magnifica'
 xGuzvriesea 'Mirabilis'

References

zahnii
Flora of Central America
Plants described in 1873